Kızılağaç is a village in the Karlıova District, Bingöl Province, Turkey. The village had a population of 192 in 2021.

The hamlet of Meşeli is attached to the village.

References 

Villages in Karlıova District
Kurdish settlements in Bingöl Province